David John Smith (born 9 November 1957 in Bulawayo, Zimbabwe) is a South African former rugby union footballer.

Playing career

Smith grew up in Rhodesia (now Zimbabwe) and played for Rhodesia in the South African Currie Cup competition. In 1980 he and his Rhodesian teammate, Ray Mordt, were selected to represent the Springboks against the touring British and Irish Lions team.
 
Smith made his debut on 31 May 1980 at Newlands, Cape Town and went on to play in all four tests in the series against the 1980 Lions.

Test history

See also
List of South Africa national rugby union players – Springbok no. 507
List of South Africa national under-18 rugby union team players

References

1957 births
Living people
South Africa international rugby union players
Rugby union centres
People from Bulawayo
Alumni of Hamilton High School (Bulawayo)
Rhodesian rugby union players